The RDS-1, also known as Izdeliye 501 (device 501) and First Lightning, was the nuclear bomb used in the Soviet Union's first nuclear weapon test. The United States assigned it the code-name Joe-1, in reference to Joseph Stalin. It was detonated on 29 August 1949 at 7:00 a.m., at the Semipalatinsk Test Site, Kazakh SSR, after top-secret research and development as part of the Soviet atomic bomb project.

Description 
The weapon was designed at the Kurchatov Institute, then at the time officially known as "Laboratory № 2" but designated as the "office" or "base" in internal documents, starting in April 1946.  Plutonium for the bomb was produced at the industrial complex Chelyabinsk-40.

The RDS-1 explosive yield was 22 kilotons TNT equivalent, similar to the US Gadget and Fat Man bombs. At Lavrentiy Beria's insistence, the RDS-1 bomb was designed as an implosion type weapon, similar to the Fat Man bomb dropped on Nagasaki, Japan; RDS-1 also had a solid plutonium core. The bomb designers had developed a more sophisticated design (tested later as RDS-2) but rejected it because of the known reliability of the Fat Man type design, the Soviets having received extensive intelligence on the design of the Fat Man bomb during World War II, which was discovered in the espionage case of Julius and Ethel Rosenberg and during the Venona project.

To test the effects of the new weapon, workers constructed houses made of wood and bricks, along with a bridge, and a simulated metro railway in the vicinity of the test site. Armoured hardware and approximately 50 aircraft were also brought to the testing grounds as well as over 1,500 animals to test the bomb's effects on life. In a sector of artillery about 100 guns and mortars were placed at distances ranging from 250 to 1,800 meters from ground zero. At distances 500 to 550 meters from ground zero artillery pieces were either totally destroyed or needed factory repair. The resulting data showed the RDS explosion to be 50% more destructive than originally estimated by its engineers.

There are several explanations for the Soviet code-name of RDS-1, usually an arbitrary designation: a backronym "Special Jet Engine" (Reaktivnyi Dvigatel Spetsialnyi), or "Stalin's Jet Engine" (Reaktivnyi Dvigatel Stalina), or "Russia does it herself" (Rossiya Delayet Sama). Later weapons were also designated RDS but with different model numbers.

Mikhail Pervukhin served as the chairman of the commission in charge of the RDS-1 testing.

Five RDS-1 weapons were completed as a pilot series by March 1950 with a serial production of the weapon that began in December 1951.

Detection by the West 
Some United States Air Force WB-29 weather reconnaissance aircraft were fitted with special filters to collect atmospheric radioactive debris. On 3 September 1949, the Air Force Office of Atomic Energy had a WB-29 fly from Misawa Air Base in Japan to Eielson Air Force Base in Alaska. The plane collected some debris during this flight. This data was then cross-checked with data from later flights, and it was determined that the Soviet Union had effectively tested a nuclear weapon.

Response in the West 
The test surprised the Western powers. American intelligence had estimated that the Soviets would not produce an atomic weapon until 1953, while the British did not expect it until 1954. When the nuclear fission products from the test were detected by the U.S. Air Force, the United States began to follow the trail of the nuclear fallout debris. President Harry S. Truman notified the world of the situation on 23 September 1949: "We have evidence that within recent weeks an atomic explosion occurred in the U.S.S.R." Truman's statement likely in turn surprised the Soviets, who had hoped to keep the test a secret to avoid encouraging the Americans to increase their atomic programs, and did not know that the United States had built a test-detection system using the WB-29 Superfortress. The announcement was a turning point in the Cold War, that had just begun. Once the Soviet Union was confirmed to be in possession of the atomic bomb, pressure mounted to develop the first hydrogen bomb.

See also 
 RDS-2
 RDS-3
 RDS-4
 RDS-6s
 RDS-37
 AN602 (Tsar Bomba)
 Plan Totality
 Julius and Ethel Rosenberg

References

External links 

 Video of the Joe-1 Nuclear Test

Joseph Stalin
1949 in the Soviet Union
1949 in military history
Explosions in 1949
August 1949 events
Nuclear proliferation
Soviet nuclear weapons testing
1949 in international relations
Nuclear weapons policy
Nuclear bombs of the Soviet Union
Cold War military history of the Soviet Union
August 1949 events in Asia